Juan Pablo Vergara Martínez (24 February 1985 – 2 December 2019) was a Peruvian professional footballer who played as a midfielder.

Career
Born in Lima, Vergara began his professional football career in 2003, when he debuted for Universitario de Deportes. He would then go on to play for various clubs in Peru such as Sport Áncash, CNI, César Vallejo, Sport Boys, Real Garcilaso, Inti Gas, Alfonso Ugarte de Puno, Los Caimanes, Atlético Minero, Sport Loreto, UTC and Deportivo Binacional. With Binacional, Vergara won the 2019 Torneo Apertura and qualified for the championship round of the 2019 Peruvian Liga 1 playoffs. However, a car accident a few days before the scheduled matches for the championship round resulted in his tragic death.

Death
On 2 December 2019, Vergara was involved in a car accident along with teammates Donald Millán and Jeferson Collazos. The three footballers were headed to Juliaca from Puno to train with Deportivo Binacional as preparation for their upcoming series of matches for the championship round of the 2019 Peruvian Liga 1 playoffs. Around 14:30 PET, Vergara's car flipped on the side of the Puno–Juliaca road due to slippery conditions caused by rain and hail. The three were helped out of the vehicle by local rescuers and taken to Clínica Americana, a clinic in Juliaca. Millán and Collazos were discharged unharmed but Vergara was in critical condition. Binacional then announced through its social media networks that blood donors were needed for surgical intervention. Hours later, the club announced the passing of Vergara. The clinic indicated through a press release that the impact of the steering wheel with Vergara resulted in "a severe massive hemorrhage in the left hemithorax." Vergara suffered a perforation of the liver by a broken rib, triggering a hemorrhage. Despite the early intervention of the doctors, the player died.

Career statistics

Honours

Club
Alfonso Ugarte
 Peruvian Segunda División runner-up: 2013

Deportivo Binacional
 Torneo Apertura: 2019
 Liga 1: 2019

Individual
 Peruvian Segunda División Player of the Year: 2013
 Peruvian Liga 1 Goal of the Year: 2019.

References

1985 births
2019 deaths
Peruvian footballers
Sport Áncash footballers
Colegio Nacional Iquitos footballers
Club Deportivo Universidad César Vallejo footballers
Sport Boys footballers
Real Garcilaso footballers
Ayacucho FC footballers
Alfonso Ugarte de Puno players
Los Caimanes footballers
Atlético Minero footballers
Footballers from Lima
Sport Loreto players
Universidad Técnica de Cajamarca footballers
Deportivo Binacional FC players
Peruvian Primera División players
Peruvian Segunda División players
Association football midfielders
Road incident deaths in Peru